André Steiner (born 8 February 1970 in Gera) is a retired German rower. During his career Steiner became an Olympic champion and a world champion.

References

1970 births
Living people
Sportspeople from Gera
People from Bezirk Gera
German male rowers
Olympic rowers of Germany
Rowers at the 1996 Summer Olympics
Olympic gold medalists for Germany
Olympic medalists in rowing
Medalists at the 1996 Summer Olympics
World Rowing Championships medalists for Germany